Australian-American singer Helen Reddy (1941–2020), often referred to as the "Queen of 70s Pop", recorded 18 studio albums, seven of which have achieved sales of 500,000 units in the US for which they were awarded Gold certification by the Recording Industry Association of America. One of those seven, I Am Woman, eventually went Platinum by reaching sales of one million copies, and her first compilation album, Helen Reddy's Greatest Hits, was awarded Double Platinum status in 1992 for hitting the two million sales mark. The respective US and Canadian album charts in Billboard and RPM magazine each had appearances by 10 of these LPs during the 1970s.

Reddy's singles had the most success on what was then Billboards Easy Listening chart (and became known as Adult Contemporary), where eight of her 24 entries reached number one. Of those 24 there were 20 that also made the Billboard Hot 100, with six of those hitting the top 10, including three ("I Am Woman", "Delta Dawn", and "Angie Baby") that reached number one. Of those 20 Hot 100 entries, 19 were also Canadian pop hits in RPM, and four of them – the three number ones and her number three hit "Leave Me Alone (Ruby Red Dress)" – earned Gold certification from the RIAA for the sales of one million copies that was the requirement for singles at that time.

Capitol years (1971–1980)

Capitol Records executive Artie Mogull sensed that a hit record could be made with the song "I Don't Know How to Love Him" from the 1970 musical Jesus Christ Superstar, and since Reddy's then-husband/manager, Jeff Wald, was tenacious in contacting him about getting Reddy her first recording session in the United States, he decided to give Reddy her big break. The success of the single led to a 1971 album of the same name and a 10-year stay with the label. That album included her first recording of "I Am Woman", which was only released as a single after being rerecorded for the 1972 film Stand Up and Be Counted. The new recording became the first of her three songs to reach number one on the Hot 100 in addition to providing the title of her third album. It also reached number two Adult Contemporary in the US, as did its follow-up, "Peaceful", which got as high as number 12 pop.

The five consecutive studio LPs that Reddy recorded between 1973 and 1976 all achieved Gold certification and peaked in the top 20 slots on the album charts in both the US and Canada. The two singles from the first of those five, Long Hard Climb, both had impressive chart runs and achieved their own Gold certification a few months after release in the US. In addition to topping the US pop chart, the first of the two, "Delta Dawn", also made it to number one Adult Contemporary there, and the second, "Leave Me Alone (Ruby Red Dress)", echoed that showing on the latter chart and got as high as number three on the Hot 100. Her first 1974 album, Love Song for Jeffrey, also had two AC number ones, "Keep on Singing" and "You and Me Against the World", that respectively peaked at  15 and 9 on the pop chart. Another two AC number ones came from her second 1974 release, Free and Easy. The first, "Angie Baby", also went to number one pop and achieved Gold certification, while the second, "Emotion", only reached number 22 on the Hot 100.

"Bluebird" was the lead single from her 1975 studio LP No Way to Treat a Lady and only peaked at number 5 Adult Contemporary and number 35 pop, but her next two singles from that album had better showings. "Ain't No Way to Treat a Lady" was yet another AC number one and made it to number eight on the Hot 100, and "Somewhere in the Night"
also did well (numbers two AC and 19 pop). Her last Gold album, 1976's Music, Music, included the last of her Adult Contemporary number ones, "I Can't Hear You No More", which had a lower pop chart showing than the previous two, at number 29. That album's second and final single, "Gladiola", was a number 10 AC hit but also became her first domestic single that failed to reach the Hot 100.

Her 1977 album Ear Candy not only ended her hot streak as it stalled at number 75 on ''Billboards ranking of the top 200 albums; it also became her last to appear there at all. The first song released from it as a single, "You're My World", became her last Hot 100 entry to make the top 40 and her last Adult Contemporary hit to make the top 10. Her final projects with the label included a concert album (Live in London) and studio efforts flavored by disco (Reddy) and rock (Take What You Find).

Post-Capitol years (1981–2020)
Reddy switched to MCA Records in 1981 and recorded Play Me Out, which yielded "I Can't Say Goodbye to You", her last song to reach either of Billboard's pop or Adult Contemporary charts. When her 1983 follow-up LP Imagination failed to get any attention, she received a letter from MCA notifying her that she was being dropped from the label.

In 1990 Reddy recorded jazz interpretations of several of her hit songs along with new material for Feel So Young, a project she initially released herself that was later repackaged and retitled by other independent labels. 1998's Center Stage was her interpretation of some of her favorite songs from musicals, and her most recent studio effort was the holiday release The Best Christmas Ever in 2000.

Albums
Studio albums 

Live albums

Compilation albums

Singles

 The B-side, "Music Is My Life", was eventually listed on the Hot 100 alongside "I Can't Hear You No More" as a "tag along" to indicate that some radio stations were opting to play the flip side of the original hit that charted.
 On "You're My World" producer Kim Fowley's website is a note that the song "was number one (#1) in Mexico (Billboard) in 1977," but in the 17 nonconsecutive weekly appearances that the song made during its chart run on Billboard'''s "Hits of the World" list of the top 10 songs in Mexico in the issues dated between October 15, 1977, and April 8, 1978, the highest position that the song achieved was number four.

Music videos

Notes

References

External links
 

Discographies of Australian artists
Pop music discographies
Discography